Taiyuan Miogee Cycling Team is a UCI Continental team, based in Shanxi, China, that was founded in 2019.

Team roster

Major wins
2019
Overall Tour de Filipinas, Jeroen Meijers
Stage 1, Jeroen Meijers
Stage 2 Tour of Indonesia, Jeroen Meijers
Stage 1 Tour of Xingtai, Amir Kolahdozhagh
Overall Tour of China I, Jeroen Meijers
Stage 4, Jeroen Meijers

References

External links

UCI Continental Teams (Asia)
Cycling teams based in China
Cycling teams established in 2019